The 1915 The Citadel Bulldogs football team represented The Citadel as a member of the Southern Intercollegiate Athletic Association (SIAA) during the 1915 college football season. Led by third-year head coach George C. Rogers, the Bulldogs compiled an overall record of 5–3 with a mark of 1–2 in SIAA play. The Citadel claims a "State Championship" for 1915 by virtue of its wins over Presbyterian and South Carolina. The Bulldogs played home games at College Park Stadium in Hampton Park.

Schedule

References

Citadel
The Citadel Bulldogs football seasons
Citadel Bulldogs football